Henry Chancellor (born 1968) is a British television director and producer and writer. Born in London, he grew up in East Anglia and went to Trinity College, Cambridge. He lives in Suffolk with his wife, two sons and daughter.

Bibliography 
 Scissorman 2018
 The Forgotten Echo: The Remarkable Adventures of Tom Scatterhorn 2012
 The Hidden World: The Remarkable Adventures of Tom Scatterhorn 2010
 The Museum's Secret: The Remarkable Adventures of Tom Scatterhorn 2009
 James Bond The Man and His World. The Official Literary Companion to James Bond 2005
 Colditz: The Definitive History 2001

Filmography 
 1983: The Brink of Apocalypse 2008 Winner of the Grierson Award 2008
 Escape from Colditz: The Best of British 2005
 Battle of the Sexes 2004
 SAS - The Real Story 2003
 St Nazaire Raid 2002
 Commando 2002
 The Golden Age 2001
 Raiders of the Spanish Maine 2001
 CNN Millennium: Century of the Sail 1999
 CNN Millennium: Century of the Axe 1999
 CNN Millennium'': Century of the Sword 1999
 Pirates! 1998 
 Litter 1997. 
 Oil on Canvas 1997. Episodes: Brushstroke, Portrait, Colour
 Seekers of the Lost Treasure: The Great Belzoni 1995.
 The Curse of the Elgin Marbles 1994
 A Time for Tea	1994
 The Van 1993
 The Miller's Tale 1993

References

External links
 
 

British film producers
English documentary filmmakers
English television directors
British documentary film directors
1968 births
Living people
21st-century British novelists
21st-century English novelists
British children's writers
British male novelists
English children's writers
English male novelists
Alumni of Trinity College, Cambridge